Raymond Frederick Schoenke (born September 10, 1941) is a former American football offensive lineman in the National Football League for the Dallas Cowboys and Washington Redskins. He played college football at Southern Methodist University.

Early years
Born in Hawaii to Olivia Pualani Alapa, a full-blooded native Hawaiian and Raymond F. Schoenke, of German descent from Minnesota, who was stationed with the U.S. Army 3rd Engineering Corp, Schofield Barracks in Hawaii where he was an All-Star athlete on their baseball and basketball teams in the late 1920s and 1930s.

Schoenke's family moved to Texas when he was 10–13 years then returned to Hawaii, where he attended Punahou School in Honolulu for grades 9-11 where he received recognition in football with an All-Star Award (the equivalent of all-State since Hawaii at the time was still a Territory). For his senior year in high school his family returned to Texas where he was an All-State football player for Weatherford High School.

In 2015, he was inducted into the Polynesian Football Hall of Fame, which honors Polynesia'a greatest football players and contributors.

College career
Schoenke accepted a football scholarship from Southern Methodist University. As a sophomore, he played defensive middle guard and was named Sophomore Lineman of the Year in the Southwest Conference. He also played at fullback, guard, tackle, center and linebacker, receiving All-Southwest conference honors in both his junior and senior years.

He received Academic All-American honors as a senior. The University honored Schoenke by awarding the SMU "M" award - recognizing him as one of the most Distinguished Seniors to graduate in the class of 1963. Later, Schoenke was also named to SMU's 75th Anniversary All Time Football Team and received the Silver Anniversary Mustang Award from the SMU Letterman's Association, which honors the character and achievements of former athletes.

Professional career
Schoenke was selected by the Dallas Cowboys in the eleventh round (146th overall) of the 1963 NFL Draft and by the Oakland Raiders in the tenth round (73rd overall) of the 1963 AFL Draft. As a rookie he was tried at tackle, guard and center. In 1964, he started 10 games at right tackle, after passing Bob Fry on the depth chart. He was waived injured on August 8, 1965.

In 1966, after being out of football for a year recovering from his injury, he signed as a free agent with the Green Bay Packers. On July 29, he was traded to the Cleveland Browns in exchange for an undisclosed draft choice (not exercised). He was released by the Browns on September 6. He was signed by the Washington Redskins to their taxi squad and was promoted to the active roster on October 1.

Schoenke became a key player on the offensive line for the next 10 years. In 1967, he was named the starter at left guard. He played in Super Bowl VII, losing 7-14 to the Miami Dolphins. In 1974, he was named the starter at left tackle. On January 21, 1976, he announced his retirement to focus on his insurance company.

In 1987, he was selected for the "50th Anniversary Greatest Redskins Team.” In 2002, Schoenke was picked as one of the top 100 players in the history of the Redskins.

Politics 
In 1998 Schoenke announced he was running for Governor of Maryland. Schoenke withdrew from the race before the primary election.

Personal life
Schoenke and his wife of 53 years, Nancy, reside in rural Montgomery County. He was nicknamed "The Mummy" for the amount of sports tape he would use, eventually neededing to go through 5 surgeries and 2 knee replacements.

References

External links
Schoenke succeeds on gridiron, in business, in community

1941 births
Living people
People from Honolulu County, Hawaii
Players of American football from Hawaii
American football offensive guards
SMU Mustangs football players
Dallas Cowboys players
Washington Redskins players
American people of German descent
American people of Native Hawaiian descent